Anne-Marie Day (born February 2, 1954) is a Canadian politician, who was elected to the House of Commons of Canada in the 2011 election. She represented the electoral district of Charlesbourg—Haute-Saint-Charles as a member of the New Democratic Party.

Prior to being elected, Day was the president of an employment agency, and is a former president of a women's issues group. She has a bachelor's degree in education and a master's degree in local and regional development from Université Laval.

Day also ran in Charlesbourg—Haute-Saint-Charles in the 2008 federal election, but lost.

Despite her anglophone-sounding name, Day is a francophone, and French is her preferred language on the Commons floor.

Electoral record

References

External links

1954 births
Members of the House of Commons of Canada from Quebec
New Democratic Party MPs
People from Gaspésie–Îles-de-la-Madeleine
Politicians from Quebec City
Women members of the House of Commons of Canada
Living people
Université Laval alumni
Women in Quebec politics
21st-century Canadian politicians
21st-century Canadian women politicians